Vishal Amin is an American attorney and government official who served as Intellectual Property Enforcement Coordinator. This position, sometimes referred to as "IP czar", was created by an act of Congress in 2008 in order to help the U.S. government combat online piracy. Prior to assuming his current role, Amin was senior counsel on the House Judiciary Committee.

A graduate of Johns Hopkins University and Washington University School of Law, Amin served in the administration of George W. Bush as the White House's associate director for domestic policy and as special assistant and associate director for policy in the United States Department of Commerce.

Cary Sherman, who serves as chairman and CEO of the Recording Industry Association of America, called Amin "a smart, thoughtful leader."

References

Living people
Johns Hopkins University alumni
Washington University School of Law alumni
21st-century American lawyers
George W. Bush administration personnel
Trump administration personnel
American politicians of Indian descent
Year of birth missing (living people)
Asian conservatism in the United States